Ro09-9212 is a thienodiazepine derivative with sedative and anxiolytic effects, which has been sold as a designer drug.

See also 
 Clotiazepam
 Clotizolam
 Diclazepam
 Etizolam
 Flubrotizolam
 Fluclotizolam
 Fluetizolam
 Ro07-4065
 Ro20-8552

References 

Designer drugs
GABAA receptor positive allosteric modulators
Diazepines
Chlorobenzenes
Thiophenes